Alys of France appears in Eleanor Anne Porden's As "Alasia of France," 1822 epic poem Cœur de Lion. In it, Alys joins the army of Saladin during the Third Crusade to avenge herself on Richard for rejecting her.

Under another spelling, Alaïs, she appears as Henry's lover in James Goldman's 1966 play The Lion in Winter. She was played by Jane Merrow in the 1968 film adaptation, by Julia Vysotskaya in the 2003 TV adaptation and by Sonya Cassidy in the 2011 London theatre production. In Christy English's novel The Queen's Pawn (2010), Alais comes to England to marry Prince Richard only to become the mistress of King Henry II.

Alys has a minor role in Sharon Kay Penman's novels, Time and Chance (2002) and Devil's Brood (2008). In Judith Koll Healey's novel The Canterbury Papers (2005), Alys is sent on a mission to England to retrieve some letters from Canterbury Cathedral for Eleanor of Aquitaine. In Healey’s second novel, The Rebel Princess, Princess Alys confronts corrupt court officials and religious fanatics in the pursuit of her disappeared illegitimate son Francis, whose very existence could unsettle the thrones of England and France.

She was played by Katherine DeMille in The Crusades (1935); by Susan Shaw in the 1963 British children's TV series Richard the Lionheart; by Lorna Charles and Lucy Gutteridge in The Devil's Crown (1978); and by Rebecca Viora in Richard the Lionheart: Rebellion (2005).

Cultural depictions of female royals